Plenty of Power is the tenth studio album by Canadian heavy metal band Anvil, released in 2001.

Track listing

Personnel
Anvil
Steve "Lips" Kudlow – vocals, lead guitar
Ivan Hurd – lead guitar
Glenn Five – bass
Robb Reiner – drums

Production
Pierre Rémillard –  engineer, mixing
Andy Khrem – mastering
Torsten Hartmann – executive producer

References

Anvil (band) albums
2001 albums
Massacre Records albums